Rupert McPherson Colmore Jr. (November 2, 1914 – December 27, 1972) was a college football player. A prominent tackle, he is the only All-Southeastern Conference selection in the history of the Sewanee Tigers football program. Philadelphia coach Bert Bell selected Colmore for All-American. His father Rupert Colmore, Sr. also played for Sewanee. Colmore turned down the chance to play professional football for Philadelphia and entered business.

Early years
Colmore was the son of Rupert Colmore Sr. He attended the Baylor School in his native Chattanooga. He is a member of its sports hall of fame.

Sewanee
Colmore also ran track and played basketball. He was a member of Alpha Tau Omega. He was inducted into the Sewanee Athletics Hall of Fame in 2004.

Personal 
Colmore married Virginia Guild. He worked for Simplicity System Company in Chattanooga.

References

1914 births
1972 deaths
Sportspeople from Chattanooga, Tennessee
All-American college football players
Players of American football from Tennessee
American football tackles
Sewanee Tigers football players
Basketball players from Tennessee
American men's basketball players